Ershausen/Geismar is a municipal association in the district of Eichsfeld, in Thuringia, Germany. The seat of the municipal association is in Schimberg.

The association consists of the following municipalities:
 Dieterode 
 Geismar 
 Kella 
 Krombach 
 Pfaffschwende 
 Schimberg 
 Schwobfeld 
 Sickerode 
 Volkerode 
 Wiesenfeld

References

Verwaltungsgemeinschaften in Thuringia